Víctor Roberto Silva Chacón (born 29 January 1959) is a Mexican politician from the Institutional Revolutionary Party. From 2010 to 2012 he served as Deputy of the LXI Legislature of the Mexican Congress representing Chihuahua.

References

1959 births
Living people
Politicians from Chihuahua (state)
Institutional Revolutionary Party politicians
21st-century Mexican politicians
Deputies of the LXI Legislature of Mexico
Members of the Chamber of Deputies (Mexico) for Chihuahua (state)